James Staton "Country" King (born February 7, 1941) is an American retired professional basketball player and former college coach.

A 6'2" guard from the University of Tulsa, King was selected by the Los Angeles Lakers in the second round of the 1963 NBA draft.  King played 10 NBA seasons (1963–1973) with four teams: the Lakers, the San Francisco Warriors, the Cincinnati Royals, and the Chicago Bulls.  He represented the Warriors in the 1968 NBA All-Star Game, and he retired with 4,377 career points.

King later coached the Tulsa Golden Hurricane from 1975 to midway through the 1979–1980 season, when he resigned after  seasons. The school retired his jersey number 24, and in 1984, he was inducted into the University of Tulsa Hall of Fame.

NBA career 

In Los Angeles, King played much of his first three seasons behind former UCLA teammates Gail Goodrich and Walt Hazzard, after which the Lakers left him unprotected in the expansion draft. No sooner were he and Jeff Mullins claimed by Chicago on May 1, 1966, than they were traded to San Francisco in return for All-Star guard Guy Rodgers. The move proved to be a fortuitous one for both players, as they were instrumental in the Warriors' drive to the 1966-67 Western Division title. On April 18, 1967, King (28 points) and superstar teammate Rick Barry (55) combined for 83 points in Game 3 of the NBA Finals, a 130–124 victory over the Philadelphia 76ers. Only the Lakers tandem of Elgin Baylor (61) and Jerry West (26) had more in a championship series game.

King was even better in the 1967–68 season, when he emerged as one of the best combo guards in the league. Despite the absence of Barry, who had jumped to the rival ABA in the off-season, the Warriors picked up where they left off, only this time with King in a lead role. In his first 15 games, he ranked among the NBA scoring leaders at 24.2 points per game. He also averaged 4.9 assists and 4.7 rebounds in that span. King suffered a serious knee injury in a game only days later, however, which would reduce his effectiveness thereafter. Nonetheless, he was selected to play with the Western team in the 1968 All-Star Game in New York.

Prior to the 1969-70 campaign, King and Bill Turner were traded to the Cincinnati Royals in return for Jerry Lucas, but he saw action in only 31 games because of knee issues. He signed with Chicago one year later and played his final three seasons off the bench there.

NBA career statistics

Regular season

Playoffs

External links
NBA career stats

1941 births
Living people
American men's basketball coaches
American men's basketball players
Basketball coaches from Oklahoma
Basketball players from Oklahoma
Chicago Bulls expansion draft picks
Chicago Bulls players
Cincinnati Royals players
Los Angeles Lakers draft picks
Los Angeles Lakers players
National Basketball Association All-Stars
Point guards
San Francisco Warriors players
Sportspeople from Fort Smith, Arkansas
Sportspeople from Tulsa, Oklahoma
Tulsa Golden Hurricane men's basketball coaches
Tulsa Golden Hurricane men's basketball players